This is a partial list of molecules that contain 10 carbon atoms.

See also
 Carbon number
 List of compounds with carbon number 9
 List of compounds with carbon number 11

C10

es:Monoterpenoides